Strasser Scheme is a British initiative to waive landing fees payable by general aviation aircraft for landings resulting from genuine emergencies, diversions and precautionary procedures.

A review of fatal accidents in general aviation, published by the CAA in 1997, concluded that the costs incurred by a pilot in case of a diversion were a contributing factor in their decision to continue a flight despite safety concerns. The landing fees for a light aircraft can be as high as £1047, and were typically payable in full regardless of the circumstances of the landing prior to the adoption of this scheme.

, only four airports remain which refuse to join the scheme, of 211 airports approached. These are: Bournemouth Airport, Lydd Airport, London Luton Airport and Manchester Airport.

References

External links
Flyer.co.uk
Gremline.com
Ukga.com

General aviation
Aviation law
Aviation in the United Kingdom